Ronald Frank Mrozinski (September 16, 1930 – October 19, 2005) was an American professional baseball player, a pitcher who played in 37 Major League Baseball games over two seasons,  and , for the Philadelphia Phillies. His professional career spanned fourteen years, from  until .

Mrozinski came up through the Phillies' organization, registering double figures in wins during each of his first four pro seasons. He threw one complete game; ironically, it was the game he lost, 5–2, on September 14 against the St. Louis Cardinals at Connie Mack Stadium. Mrozinski had held the Cards to two runs into the eighth inning before giving up back-to-back home runs to Red Schoendienst (a two-run job) and Rip Repulski. Ten days later, Mrozinski earned his only big-league win, going 6 innings against the eventual world champion New York Giants. In that game, Mrozinski left with a 4–2 lead, and was relieved by a Baseball Hall of Famer, Robin Roberts, who shut down the Giants for the remainder of the game to earn a save.

In , he appeared in 22 games for Philadelphia, making only one start, and was winless in two decisions. He did, however, earn his only MLB save that year when he preserved a 10–8 victory over the Cardinals on June 21.  The 1955 campaign was Mrozinski's only full year and his last season on a big-league roster. In his 37 games and 82 innings pitched, he allowed 87 hits and 44 bases on balls; he also struck out 44.  Returning to the minors in 1957, he racked up four more years with double-digit victories, and won 119 games overall before retiring from the game.

Ron Mrozinski died at his home in Washington, New Jersey.

References

Sources

Retrosheet
Venezuelan Professional Baseball League

1930 births
2005 deaths
Baltimore Orioles (IL) players
Baseball players from Pennsylvania
Birmingham Barons players
Buffalo Bisons (minor league) players
Carbondale Pioneers players
Charlotte Hornets (baseball) players
Chattanooga Lookouts players
Industriales de Valencia players
Major League Baseball pitchers
People from Luzerne County, Pennsylvania
People from Washington, New Jersey
Philadelphia Phillies players
Sacramento Solons players
Schenectady Blue Jays players
Sportspeople from Warren County, New Jersey
Syracuse Chiefs players
Terre Haute Phillies players
Tulsa Oilers (baseball) players
Williamsport Grays players
Wilmington Blue Rocks (1940–1952) players